Bentley Collingwood Hilliam ( Smailes; 6 November 1890 – 19 December 1968), usually credited as B. C. Hilliam, was an English singer, songwriter and musician, and the first-named member of the comedy duo Mr. Flotsam and Mr. Jetsam (Mr. Jetsam was Malcolm McEachern).

Hilliam wrote most of the duo's songs, played the piano and sang in a "light, high tenor voice". The duo's only film appearance is in the prelude of the 1936 Tod Slaughter melodrama The Crimes of Stephen Hawke. He married Mona C Barrett-Lennard, his second wife, in December 1926 in Lambeth, London.

Hilliam also wrote music and lyrics, such as Ladies of Leamington, and was musical director, for the stage play Buddies, and starred in his own concert-party shows, Flotsam's Follies, whose cast included a young Tony Hancock.

Hilliam was born in Scarborough, North Yorkshire in 1890, as Bentley Collingwood Smailes. He began his career as an entertainer at local functions, under the name Lloyd Holland, and also attended the local boys' school Scarborough College from 1902 to 1906. Hilliam wrote a series of odes for the school magazine under the pseudonym Aimless, an anagram of Smailes. He later changed his name permanently from Smailes to Hilliam.

During World War I, he served as a Lieutenant in the Canadian Engineers.

In 1935 he appeared in court after his first wife attempted to have him declared bankrupt for failure to pay alimony. His address was given as residing at Cadnam, Hampshire, England, and formerly West Hill, Highgate, London. On 23 May 1935, a conditional order of discharge was made. The case continued, with an adjournment in October of that year, when his address was given as Robin Grove, West Hill.

He appeared as a castaway on the BBC Radio programme Desert Island Discs on 3 August 1959.

Bibliography

References

External links 
 
 Account of his life as an Entertainer by Ernest Elliott - a performer in the Flotsam Follies
 Here's a ho! Vancouver Sheet music

1890 births
1968 deaths
British male songwriters
20th-century British pianists
20th-century British male singers
Canadian Military Engineers
People from Hampshire (before 1974)
People from Highgate
People educated at Scarborough College
People from Scarborough, North Yorkshire
Musicians from Yorkshire
Canadian Militia officers
Canadian Expeditionary Force officers
Canadian military personnel of World War I
Royal Canadian Engineers officers